Roscrea RFC is an Irish Rugby union club based in Roscrea, County Tipperary, playing in Division 3 of the Leinster League. The club colours are maroon and white.

Club Honours
Garryowen Cup:  1953-'54
Manseragh Cup:  1969-'70
Emerson Cup: (Provincial 7-a-side)  1974-'75; 1977-'78
Leinster Senior Cup: (Qualified) 1971-'72; 1979-'80
Gale Cup: 1974-'75; 1976-'77; 1982-'83; 2000-'01; 2005-'06
Provincial Towns Cup: 1974-'75; 1979-'80
Provincial Towns Plate: 1976-'77; 1984-'85; 1997-'98; 2005-'06
Midland League: 1970-'71; 1971-'72; 1979-'80; 2001-'02; 2006-'07
Midland League 2nd XV: 1974-'75; 1976-'77; 1979-'80; 1983-'84; 2002-'03; 2003-'04; 2006-'07; 2009-'10; 2011-'12

Club history
There was a rugby club in Roscrea during the second world war years. It was formed following a meeting in 1940. The President was Mr. A.C. Houlihan and Paddy Collins became the first captain. The club colours were all white, and all home games were played at Beechwalk.
The highlight was probably the defeat of Thurles in the Mansergh Cup. This was only the club's fourth match. This was probably the best performance of their existence. Travel was restricted during the war years, so the games were limited. The club seems to have faded by 1944. Subsequently, there was the Rossory Rangers who had their pitch at Shanboe. This team only lasted a short time as well with some players switching to Rathdowney. Meanwhile, some Roscrea lads played with Birr in subsequent years, and it was after Birr's exit from the PTC in 1949-50, when seven of the team were from Roscrea, that the idea was mooted of a club being formed in the town.

The first meeting was held in March 1950. H.M. Read(a local man who had won 13 caps for Ireland and who became President of the IRFU 6 years later) was elected president. The club colours are maroon and white and the reason for this makes a nice little story. Originally the committee had opted for an all-white strip but when they attempted to register the colours with the Leinster branch they were refused on the grounds that other clubs were using the colours. Shortly afterward the club secretary went to a hurling match between Tipperary and Galway. He was very taken with the Galway colours of maroon and white, so Roscrea has used these colours ever since. This year the jerseys have been re-designed and now they are maroon with white stripes. During the summer the club affiliated to the Leinster branch.
As regards a ground, the club seems to have initially looked at acquiring a pitch at Benamore, a possible pitch on the Limerick road, with eventually a pitch being obtained at Mount Heaton courtesy of Tom Lalor.

The first official match was on 1 October 1950, when Birr were the visitors to Roscrea for a friendly, and was beaten 12-0. Three of the tries were scored by Seamus Power, the other by Tom McCann. The Roscrea team was: Dwyer, McCann, Dunne, Tobin, Power, Rafter, Power, Mossop, O'Connor, Wallace, McManus, Burke, Smith, Reardon, Barry and O Connell.

Success came quickly when Roscrea won the Garryowen cup in 1952 but it was not until 1970 that the second trophy the Manseragh Cup was won Roscrea scaled the heights in 1975 and again in 1980 when they won the Provincial Towns cup- the premier competition for junior clubs in Leinster. Midland's leagues were won during this period and they also qualified to compete in the Leinster senior cup twice. The structure of Leinster rugby has changed in the 1990s with the junior league and 4 divisions.

For a number of years, Roscrea languished in division two and in 1999 gained promotion to division one in 1999. This was a brand new ball game. Roscrea had to compete against teams from larger towns like Dundalk, Kilkenny, Naas and Navan. This they did and finished comfortably in the top half of the league, easily retaining their division status. Coach Kevin O'Dwyer was instrumental in developing the players and bringing them to a higher level, which must be maintained to remain in Division one which is highly competitive.

Roscrea were relegated at the end of the 2017-18 season and currently play in Division 3 of the Leinster League.

References
 
 Domestic Fixtures & Results

Irish rugby union teams
Rugby clubs established in 1950
Rugby union clubs in County Tipperary